All Saints Memorial Church is a historic Episcopal church at 674 Westminster Street in Federal Hill, Providence, Rhode Island. The current church building, a large brownstone structure with a flat-topped tower, was designed by architect Edward Tuckerman Potter in a Gothic, Tudor Revival style, and built from 1869 to 1872. It is the largest Episcopal church building in the state, and its only known Potter-designed church. The accompanying (now-demolished) parish house is a Tudor Revival structure designed by Gorham Henshaw and built in 1909.

The church building added to the National Register of Historic Places in 1980.

See also
 National Register of Historic Places listings in Providence, Rhode Island

References

External links

 Official Church Website

Episcopal churches in Rhode Island
Churches on the National Register of Historic Places in Rhode Island
Edward Tuckerman Potter church buildings
Churches in Providence, Rhode Island
National Register of Historic Places in Providence, Rhode Island